The 2012 IPSC Shotgun World Shoot I held in Debrecen, Hungary was the 1st IPSC Shotgun World Shoot, and consisted of 30 stages over 5 days and over 400 competitors.

Champions

Open 
The Open division was the second largest division with 121 competitors (29.1 %).

Individual

Teams

Modified 
The Modified division had 63 competitors (15.1 %).

Individual

Teams

Standard 
The Standard division was the largest division with 125 competitors (30 %).

Individual

Teams

Standard Manual 
The Standard Manual division was the third largest division with 107 competitors (25.7 %).

Individual

Teams

See also 
IPSC Handgun World Shoots
IPSC Rifle World Shoots
IPSC Action Air World Shoots

References 

IPSC :: Match Results (Summary) - 2011 Handgun World Shoot, Greece
Official Final Results (Full): 2012 SG World Shoot I

External links 
Video compilation: IPSC Shotgun World Championship 2012 by ShootingPress International

2012
IPSC
Shooting competitions in Hungary
2012 in Hungarian sport
International sports competitions hosted by Hungary